Canzonissima was an Italian musical variety show broadcast by Rai 1 from 1958 to 1974, aired on Saturday evening except for the last two editions in which it was aired on Sunday afternoon. The program was referred to as "the synthesis and the model of comparison of the Italian television variety".

History

It was born in radio as a song tournament in 1956, with the title Le canzoni della fortuna and gained great public success. The following year it was brought on television titled Voci e volti della fortuna and turned into a competition between amateurs from the various regions of Italy, with the participation of some professional singers, who competed in a separate group.
In 1958, the variety took the name Canzonissima that remained until the end, with an exception from 1963 to 1967 when the transmission continued with new formats and new titles; Gran Premio, Napoli contro tutti, La prova del nove, Scala reale e Partitissima.

The show consisted of a musical contest (with singers combined with some state lottery numbers) from the elaborate rules which were generally different from one edition to another; the competition was interspersed with dances and comedy sketches involving  special guests.

The 1959 edition contributed to the launch Nino Manfredi's career, and the 1970 edition launched the career of Raffaella Carrà.
The 1962 edition, hosted by Dario Fo and Franca Rame, generated large political controversities due to use of censorship to cut some satirical sketches of Fo; the couple Fo-Rame was eventually fired, and the scandal lead to a long interruption of five years.

Editions

References

External links

1958 Italian television series debuts
1974 Italian television series endings
Italian music television series
RAI original programming
Black-and-white television shows
1950s Italian television series
1960s Italian television series
1970s Italian television series
Variety television series
Italy in the Eurovision Song Contest
Eurovision Song Contest selection events